Statistics of Emperor's Cup in the 1998 season.

Overview
It was contested by 82 teams, and Yokohama Flügels won the championship.

Results

1st round
Omiya Ardija 1–0 TDK
Mitsubishi Nagasaki SC 0–4 Chuo University
FC Primeiro 1–0 Nihon University Yamagata High School
Gifu Technical High School 1–2 Kagoshima Vocational High School
Kawasoe Club 0–6 Ventforet Kofu
Nippon Steel Corporation Oita FC 1–3 Doto University
Juntendo University 0–1 Otsuka Pharmaceuticals
Sanwa Club 1–4 Tokushima Municipal High School
Matsushita Electric Works FC 0–5 Denso
Maebashi Ikuei High School 0–7 Tsukuba University
Chukyo University 1–4 Tokyo Gas
Tokai University 0–0 (PK 3–0) Teihens FC
Kagawa Shiun Club 1–9 Kawasaki Frontale
Niigata Shukyu-Kai 0–2 YKK AP SC
Nirasaki Astros 2–3 Brummell Sendai
Tokuyama University 2–4 Kansai University
Kwansei Gakuin University 3–2 Shizuoka Sangyo University
Teijin SC 0–6 Kokushikan University
Iwami FC 1–9 Montedio Yamagata
Meiji University 5–0 Nippon Steel Corporation Kamaishi FC
Tenri University 2–3 Honda
Hosho High School 4–1 Ueda Gentian
Koga Club 0–9 Oita Trinita
Kyushu Sangyo University 1–2 Ritsumeikan University
Kyoiku Kenkyusha 0–4 Albirex Niigata
Hannan University 3–2 Hatsushiba Hashimoto High School
Gainare Tottori 0–3 Sagan Tosu
Tochigi SC 3–2 Ozu High School
Fukuyama University 2–2 (PK 4–3) Fukui Teachers
Sony Sendai 2–1 Aster Aomori
Mito HollyHock 4–2 Mitsubishi Motors Mizushima
Himawari Milk Nangoku SC 2–7 Komazawa University

2nd round
Omiya Ardija 2–0 Chuo University
Consadole Sapporo 1–0 FC Primeiro
Kagoshima Jitsugyo High School 0–7 Vissel Kobe
Ventforet Kofu 6–1 Doto University
Otsuka Pharmaceuticals 4–2 Tokushima Municipal High School
Denso 1–3 Tsukuba University
Tokyo Gas 2–0 Tokai University
Kawasaki Frontale 1–0 YKK AP SC
Brummell Sendai 2–1 Kansai University
Kwansei Gakuin University 3–1 Kokushikan University
Montedio Yamagata 1–0 Meiji University
Honda FC 4–0 Hosho High School
Oita Trinita 2–1 Ritsumeikan University
Albirex Niigata 3–1 Hannan University
Sagan Tosu 4–0 Tochigi SC
Kyoto Purple Sanga 9–0 Fukuyama University
Sony Sendai 0–5 Avispa Fukuoka
Mito HollyHock 4–3 Komazawa University

3rd round
Júbilo Iwata 2–0 Omiya Ardija
Consadole Sapporo 2–1 Vissel Kobe
Cerezo Osaka 4–6 Ventforet Kofu
Yokohama Flügels 4–2 Otsuka Pharmaceuticals
Kashima Antlers 3–1 Tsukuba University
Bellmare Hiratsuka 2–1 Tokyo Gas
Sanfrecce Hiroshima 2–1 Kawasaki Frontale
Yokohama Marinos 0–1 Brummell Sendai
Nagoya Grampus Eight 3–1 Kwansei Gakuin University
Gamba Osaka 1–2 Montedio Yamagata
JEF United Ichihara 0–2 Honda FC
Verdy Kawasaki 1–0 Oita Trinita
Urawa Red Diamonds 4–1 Albirex Niigata
Kashiwa Reysol 3–1 Sagan Tosu
Kyoto Purple Sanga 2–3 Avispa Fukuoka
Shimizu S-Pulse 5–0 Mito HollyHock

4th round
Júbilo Iwata 3–2 Consadole Sapporo
Ventforet Kofu 0–3 Yokohama Flügels
Kashima Antlers 3–0 Bellmare Hiratsuka
Sanfrecce Hiroshima 3–0 Brummell Sendai
Nagoya Grampus Eight 3–2 Montedio Yamagata
Honda FC 1–3 Verdy Kawasaki
Urawa Red Diamonds 3–1 Kashiwa Reysol
Avispa Fukuoka 2–3 Shimizu S-Pulse

Quarterfinals
Júbilo Iwata 1–2 Yokohama Flügels
Kashima Antlers 2–1 Sanfrecce Hiroshima
Nagoya Grampus Eight 2–1 Verdy Kawasaki
Urawa Red Diamonds 0–1 Shimizu S-Pulse

Semifinals
Yokohama Flügels 1–0 Kashima Antlers
Nagoya Grampus Eight 1–2 Shimizu S-Pulse

Final

Yokohama Flügels 2–1 Shimizu S-Pulse
Yokohama Flügels won the championship.

This was the last match of Flügels as a club, as they merged with Yokohama Marinos. As a result, Shimizu took their place in the subsequent Xerox Super Cup and Asian Cup Winners' Cup competitions.

References
 NHK

Emperor's Cup
Emperor's Cup
1999 in Japanese football